Panhard Nunatak is the nearest nunatak to the coast on the north side of Russell East Glacier, surmounting Smokinya Cove in Trinity Peninsula, Antarctica. Named by United Kingdom Antarctic Place-Names Committee (UK-APC) for René Panhard (1841–1908), French engineer who in 1891 was jointly responsible with E. Levassor for a motor car design which originated the principles on which most subsequent developments were based.

Map
 Trinity Peninsula. Scale 1:250000 topographic map No. 5697. Institut für Angewandte Geodäsie and British Antarctic Survey, 1996.

References
 SCAR Composite Antarctic Gazetteer.

Nunataks of Trinity Peninsula